Plasser & Theurer is an Austrian manufacturer of rail track maintenance and track laying machines. It accounts for 6% of Austrian exports of the machinery and iron and steel construction industry.

History 
The company was established in 1953 by a group of nine people. It is a privately owned company with 30% being held by Josef Theurer, 30% by his daughter Elisabeth Max-Theurer, 20% each by Dorothea Theurer and Hans-Jörg Holleis. Currently the company is active in over 100 countries.

In 2019, the company appointed a new chief operating officer, Dr Daniel Siedl, as well as a new chief technical officer- Dr Winfried Büdenbender.

Products 

Plasser & Theurer manufactures railway maintenance machines for all purposes including adjusting and tamping tracks, the installation and maintenance of overhead wires and the associated equipment.

Other products include railway bridge inspection and repair vehicles and flash-butt welding machines.

Clients
 Belgian Railways SNCB
 Bay Area Rapid Transit
 EM 110c Track geometry car
 Toronto Transit Commission
 RT7 Diesel locomotive by Plasser American
 RT8 train of 13 rail delivery articulated bogies by Plasser American
 RT41 Tie tamper car by Plasser American

Divisions
 Deutsche Plasser - Founded in 1960 and based in Munich with facilities in Germany, Poland and Norway
 Plasser UK Limited - Based in London with sales, service and repair facilities
 Plasser Italiana S.R.L. - Founded 1963 and based in Velletri; designs and manufactures equipment
 Plasser Española, S.A. (Plasser Iberica) - Founded 1974 and based in Toledo with regional office and production facility
 Nippon Plasser Kabushiki Kaisha - Founded 1971 with offices in Tokyo and Nagoya, training centre in Tokyo; provides sales and support in the Far East
 Plasser Far East - Founded 1979 and based in Hong Kong. Sales and support in Philippines, China, South Korea, Thailand, Malaysia and Singapore.  
 Plasser Australia - Founded 1970 and based in St. Marys, New South Wales; regional office and track maintenance and construction equipment plant
 Plasser India Pvt. Limited - Founded in mid 1960s and based in Faridabad since 1965
 Plasser South Africa Pty. Limited - Founded in 1959 as Plasser Railway Machinery South Africa (Pty) Ltd.  Currently trading as Plasser South Africa (Pty) Ltd since February 2009.  Based in Roodepoort with machine sales and support services to neighbouring countries.
 Plasser American - based in Chesapeake, Virginia serving clients in the United States and Canada. Founded as Plasser Railway Maintenance Corporation in 1961 and took on the current name in mid 1960s.

See also 
 Maintenance of way

References 

Rail infrastructure manufacturers
Manufacturing companies based in Vienna
Austrian brands